Jorge Moisés Campos Valdés  (born September 19, 1991 in Havana) is a Cuban table tennis player. On club level he competes for Panathinaikos.

He competed at the 2016 Summer Olympics in the men's singles event, in which he was eliminated in the first round by Eugene Wang. He also competed at the 2020 Summer Olympics in the mixed doubles event, with fellow Cuban athlete Daniela Fonseca.

References

External links
 
 
 Jorge Moises Campos :El Camino a sido largo ,pero estoy feliz

1991 births
Living people
Cuban male table tennis players
Olympic table tennis players of Cuba
Table tennis players at the 2016 Summer Olympics
Pan American Games medalists in table tennis
Pan American Games bronze medalists for Cuba
Panathinaikos table tennis players
Table tennis players at the 2011 Pan American Games
Table tennis players at the 2019 Pan American Games
Table tennis players at the 2015 Pan American Games
Medalists at the 2011 Pan American Games
Medalists at the 2019 Pan American Games
Table tennis players at the 2020 Summer Olympics